Wheelan is a surname. Notable people and fictional characters with the name include:

People
 Belle Wheelan (born 1951) U.S. educator
 Brooks Wheelan (born 1986) U.S. standup comic
 Charles Wheelan (born 1966) U.S. journalist
 Ed Wheelan (1888-1966) U.S. cartoonist
 Fairfax Henry Wheelan (1856-1915) U.S. businessman
 William E. Wheelan (1872-1921) U.S. politician

Fictional characters
 Doc Wheelan, a character from the 1980 film Dark Forces aka Harlequin (film)

See also

 
 Whelan (surname)